The 1998 season was the Baltimore Ravens' third season in the National Football League (NFL) and the last of Ted Marchibroda's three-year tenure as head coach of the organization. This was the Ravens' first year playing at Ravens Stadium at Camden Yards (now known as M&T Bank Stadium).  

The season also included a November 29 visit from the city's former team, the Colts, for the first time since their controversial relocation in 1984.

Offseason

NFL draft

Staff

Roster

Preseason

Schedule

Regular season

Schedule 

Note: Intra-division opponents are in bold text.

Standings

Milestones 
 This was the Ravens' first season at Ravens Stadium at Camden Yards (now M&T Bank Stadium)

References

External links 
 1998 Baltimore Ravens at Pro-Football-Reference.com
 Shpigel, Ben. "The Harbaugh Who Did Not Last in Baltimore," The New York Times, Monday, January 28, 2013.

Baltimore Ravens
Baltimore Ravens seasons
Baltimore Ravens
1990s in Baltimore